Image restoration is the operation of taking a corrupt/noisy image and estimating the clean, original image. Corruption may come in many forms such as motion blur, noise and camera mis-focus. Image restoration is performed by reversing the process that blurred the image and such is performed by imaging a point source and use the point source image, which is called the Point Spread Function (PSF) to restore the image information lost to the blurring process.

Image restoration is different from image enhancement in that the latter is designed to emphasize features of the image that make the image more pleasing to the observer, but not necessarily to produce realistic data from a scientific point of view. Image enhancement techniques (like contrast stretching or de-blurring by a nearest neighbor procedure) provided by imaging packages use no a priori model of the process that created the image.

With image enhancement noise can effectively be removed by sacrificing some resolution, but this is not acceptable in many applications. In a fluorescence microscope, resolution in the z-direction is bad as it is. More advanced image processing techniques must be applied to recover the object.

Main use cases 
The objective of image restoration techniques is to reduce noise and recover resolution loss. Image processing techniques are performed either in the image domain or the frequency domain. The most straightforward and a conventional technique for image restoration is deconvolution, which is performed in the frequency domain and after computing the Fourier transform of both the image and the PSF and undo the resolution loss caused by the blurring factors. Nowadays, photo restoration is done using digital tools and software to fix any type of damage images may have and improve the general quality and definition of the details.

AI image restoration 
This deconvolution technique, because of its direct inversion of the PSF which typically has poor matrix condition number, amplifies noise and creates an imperfect deblurred image. Also, conventionally the blurring process is assumed to be shift-invariant. Hence more sophisticated techniques, such as regularized deblurring, have been developed to offer robust recovery under different types of noises and blurring functions.

Types of AI corrections 
1. Geometric correction

2. radiometric correction 

3. noise removal

References

Digital photography
Image processing
Conservation and restoration of cultural heritage